Seth Kwame Acheampong (born December 18, 1971) is a Ghanaian politician and member of the Seventh Parliament of the Fourth Republic of Ghana representing the Mpraeso Constituency in the Eastern Region on the ticket of the New Patriotic Party.

Personal life 
Acheampong is a Christian (Presbyterian). He is married.

Early life and education 
Acheampong was born on December 18, 1971. He hails from Atibie-Kwahu, a town in the Eastern Region of Ghana. He entered the Graduate School of Management, France, Paris and obtained his postgraduate diploma in Management in 2008.

Politics 
Acheampong is a member of the New Patriotic Party (NPP). He is a member of the 5th, 6th and 7th parliament of the 4th Republic of Ghana. He first came into the parliament in January 2009 obtaining 17,519 votes out of 25,468 valid votes in his Constituency. In 2012, he contested for re-election into the Mpraeso Constituency parliamentary seat on the ticket of the NPP to become a member of the sixth parliament of the fourth republic and won. He is still representing his Constituency till date.

References

Ghanaian MPs 2017–2021
1971 births
Living people
New Patriotic Party politicians